Catocala fuscinupta is a moth of the family Erebidae first described by George Hampson in 1913. It is found in Himachal Pradesh, India.

References

Moths described in 1913
fuscinupta
Moths of Asia